Chenopodium fremontii is a species of flowering plant in the family Amaranthaceae known by the common name Frémont's goosefoot. Both the species' specific epithet, and the common name derive from the 19th century western pioneer John C. Frémont.

It is native to much of the western half of North America from Canada through California to Mexico.

Description
Chenopodium fremontii is an annual herb growing an erect stem up to 50 to 80 centimeters in maximum height. It is powdery in texture, especially on the leaves and flowers. The leaves are up to 4 centimeters long, oval to triangular, and generally with a few lobes.

The inflorescence is a spike of several clusters of tightly-packed tiny flowers. Each flower has five lobes and coats the developing fruit. It flowers from  June to October.

Uses
Many Native American tribes utilize this plant for food, the greens as a vegetable and the seeds as grain for bread and porridge.

References

External links

Jepson Manual Treatment - Chenopodium fremontii
USDA Plants Profile: Chenopodium fremontii
Flora of North America: Chenopodium fremontii

fremontii
Flora of the Western United States
Flora of Northwestern Mexico
Flora of Western Canada
Flora of the Sierra Nevada (United States)
Flora of the Rocky Mountains
Flora of California
Flora of the California desert regions
Natural history of the California chaparral and woodlands
Natural history of the Mojave Desert
Leaf vegetables
Plants used in Native American cuisine
John C. Frémont
Taxa named by Sereno Watson
Flora without expected TNC conservation status